Jude (Judas) Hall was an African-American soldier in the American Revolutionary War. He served from 1775 to 1783, thus earning his freedom from slavery. After the war, he married and settled in Exeter, New Hampshire, where his homestead is still known as Jude's Pond. Three of his children were kidnapped and sold into slavery, and two of his grandsons fought in the American Civil War.

Military service
Jude Hall, of Exeter, New Hampshire, enlisted in May 1775 in the 3rd New Hampshire militia regiment and fought in the Revolutionary War under General Enoch Poor for eight years, earning his freedom from slavery. He was profiled in William C. Nell's book Colored Patriots of New Hampshire, with Sketches of Several Distinguished Colored Persons in 1855, which states: "He was a great soldier and was known in NH to the day of his death by the name Old Rock." Hall was possibly the most famous New Hampshire African-American patriot.

Timeline

 May 10, 1775: Enlisted as a private in Jacob Hind's Company, 3rd New Hampshire Regiment.
 June 17, 1775: Fought at Bunker Hill, thrown by nearby cannonball.
 Nov. 1776: Re-enlisted in Clayes' Company, 2nd NH Regiment, for three years.
 1777–1779: Saw action at Ticonderoga, Trenton, Saratoga, and Hubbardton. Was ill and recovered in Albany while his regiment continued on to Valley Forge. Fought at Battle of Monmouth, earning nickname "Rock". Served in the Sullivan-Clinton Expedition against the Iroquois on the southwestern fringes of New York state and eventually redeployed to guard the Hudson Highlands and the string of forts surrounding West Point.
December 1779: Re-enlisted again, serving in Rowell's Company, 2nd New Hampshire.
 1782–1783: Encamped at New Windsor along with the 1st New Hampshire, forming the New Hampshire Battalion.
 1783: Discharged and returned to Exeter, NH.

After his eight years of service, he received compensation in October 1786.

Family life 

Hall lived his entire life in the Exeter area. "Jude's Pond", located on 70 Drinkwater Road in Exeter, New Hampshire, was his homestead as a free man and still bears his name.  The location is quite near to the Blake farm (now Yorkfield Stables), where he was possibly born, and was once enslaved with others. The area where Jude raised his family is still quite wooded and lonely, and the two room home no longer stands. 

Jude married Rhoda (Paul), sister of Reverend Thomas Paul, in 1785 and they had a large family on Drinkwater Road. Three of their sons (James, Aaron, and William) were stolen into slavery. His eldest daughter Dorothy married Robert Roberts, butler to Massachusetts Senator Christopher Gore and author of House Servants Directory (published in 1827). 
Roberts gave affidavit testimony regarding 18-year-old James' abduction in 1819 from his home on Drinkwater Road by an Exeter citizen, (as described in the House Servant's Directory 2015 edition "introduction xi" by Graham Russell Hodges). Conflicting stories show that Rhoda Hall also sent an affidavit into The Liberator Newspaper, which was printed on March 8, 1834, saying James sailed on the ship "Wallace" out of Newburyport, MA., under command of Capt. Isaac Stone. and was sold into slavery at the port of Alexandria, VA. Ship manifests show him on the "Ship Superb" sailing from Baltimore to New Orleans on April 6, 1819, to be sold by Hector McClean & Co to Dr. John Towle of Kentucky. Of their sons, only George remained to carry on the family name.

Three of Jude and Rhoda's grandsons, Moses, Aaron and Luke Hall served in the Civil War. Jude and Rhoda's nephew was the Exeter-born abolitionist poet James Monroe Whitfield, via Rhoda's sister, Nancy Paul.

In his history of the town of Exeter, published in 1888, Charles Henry Bell penned a memorable description of Jude Hall as "a man of powerful physique...it is said that the parts of his ribs which are usually cartilaginous were of solid bone, so that his vital organs were enclosed in a sort of osseous case." and also "a powerful man who could lift a barrel of cider and drink from it." According to Bell, Hall was the chief witness of the government in the trial of John Blaisdell for the 1822 homicide of another Exeter resident, John Wadleigh. Both were neighbors of Hall.

Hall died in 1827, and his actual gravesite is unknown. In 2000, Ed Wall, a descendant of Hall's enslaver erected a memorial stone in his honor in the Winter Street Cemetery in Exeter, in the section where other Black patriots still have stones. Widow Rhoda moved to Belfast, Maine, to live with her daughters Rhoda Ann and Mary Jane Cook. Rhoda died February 21, 1844, in Belfast, her obelisk is in the Grove Cemetery.

Recent Acknowledgements 
In 2019, the Jude Hall Wikipedia page was created

In 2020, Jude Hall's family story was included as a part of the historical-fiction book "Incident at Exeter Tavern" by RM Allen.

In May 2022 the homesite, currently part of the Phillips Exeter Academy woods, became a registered archeological site.

As of May 2022, Jude Hall has an application in process to become a "NSDAR accepted patriot" in the Daughters of the American Revolution. Once accepted, descendants can claim him in the program.

Genealogical Society 
In 2021, the "Jude & Rhoda Hall Society" Facebook page was created, with a downloadable tree. Descendants and researchers have the ability to interact.

Marker Locations 

 Memorial Stone - Winter Street Cemetery, Exeter NH
 Jude's Pond signage - 70 (apprx) Drinkwater Road, Exeter NH
 Coming in May 2023 - memorial granite step at the American Independence Museum, Exeter NH

References

House Servant's Directory by Robert Roberts, published 1827 by Monroe and Francis of Boston  (Jude Hall story in introduction xi by Graham Russell Hodges 2015 edition)

1827 deaths
New Hampshire militiamen in the American Revolution
Black Patriots
People from Exeter, New Hampshire